The Dominica Amateur Athletic Association (DAAA) is the governing body for
the sport of athletics in the Commonwealth of Dominica.  Current president is Godwin Dorsette.  He was elected in December 2015.

History 
DAAA was founded in 1985, and was affiliated to the IAAF in 1986.

Affiliations 
DAAA is the national member federation for Dominica in the following international organisations:
International Association of Athletics Federations (IAAF)
North American, Central American and Caribbean Athletic Association (NACAC)
Association of Panamerican Athletics (APA)
Central American and Caribbean Athletic Confederation (CACAC)
Moreover, it is part of the following national organisations:
Dominica Olympic Committee (DOC)

National records 
DAAA maintains the Dominica records in athletics.

External links 
Official webpage
DAAA on facebook

References 

Dominica
Athletics in Dominica
Athletics
1985 establishments in Dominica
Sports organizations established in 1985
National governing bodies for athletics